Jamaica competed at the 1988 Summer Olympics in Seoul, South Korea. 35 competitors, 24 men and 11 women, took part in 22 events in 5 sports.

Competitors
The following is the list of number of competitors in the Games.

Medalists

Athletics

Men's Marathon 
 Derek Adamson
 Final — 2"47.57 (→ 84th place)

Men's 4 × 100 m Relay 
 Christopher Faulknor, Gregory Meghoo, John Mair, and Clive Wright 
 Heat — 39.53
 Semi Final — 38.75
 Final — 38.47 (→ 4th place)

Men's 4 × 400 m Relay 
 Howard Burnett, Devon Morris, Trevor Graham, and Howard Davis 
 Heat — 3:04.00
 Trevor Graham, Devon Morris, Bertland Cameron, and Howard Davis
 Semi Final — 3:00.94
 Howard Davis, Devon Morris, Winthrop Graham, and Bertland Cameron
 Final — 3:00.30 (→  Silver Medal)

Women's 4 × 100 m Relay 
 Ethlyn Tate, Grace Jackson, Vivienne Spence, and Laurel Johnson
 Heat — 43.50
 Ethlyn Tate, Grace Jackson, Juliet Cuthbert, and Merlene Ottey
 Semi Final — 43.30
 Final — DNS (→ no ranking)

Women's 4 × 400 m Relay 
 Marcia Tate, Andrea Thomas, Cathy Rattray-Williams, and Sharon Powell 
 Heat — 3:26.83
 Sandie Richards, Andrea Thomas, Cathy Rattray-Williams, and Sharon Powell 
 Final — 3:23.13 (→ 5th place)

Boxing

Cycling

Three male cyclists represented Jamaica in 1988.

Men's road race
 Raymond Thomas
 Arthur Tenn

Men's points race
 Peter Aldridge

Table tennis

Weightlifting

References

Nations at the 1988 Summer Olympics
1988
Olympics